NGC 7673 is a disturbed spiral galaxy located in the constellation Pegasus. The galaxy has recently experienced intense star formation activity and may therefore be referred to as a starburst galaxy.

References

External links
 
 ESA homepage for the Hubble Space telescope Pictures and information on NGC 7673
 ESA Science & Technology Pictures and more detailed information on NGC 7673

Unbarred spiral galaxies
Pegasus (constellation)
7673
12607
71493
Starburst galaxies